Mega-Float may refer to:

 Mega-Float, an experimental 1000-meter floating runway in Tokyo Bay, existing from 2000 until 2001
 A very large pontoon-type floating structure